Yuri Ivanovich Simonov (born 4 March 1941) is a Russian conductor.  He studied at the Leningrad Conservatory under Nikolai Rabinovich, and was later an assistant conductor to Yevgeny Mravinsky with the Leningrad Philharmonic Orchestra.

Simonov first conducted at the Bolshoi Theatre in 1969, and was named chief conductor of the company in February 1970, the youngest chief conductor in the company's history at that time.  He held the post until 1985.  In 1986, he established the USSR Maly State Orchestra, and subsequently made several commercial recordings with the ensemble.  He became music director of the Moscow Philharmonic Orchestra in 1998. Outside of Russia, Simonov was music director of the Belgian National Orchestra from 1994 to 2002.

Selected recordings
 Rodion Shchedrin: ballet - Anna Karenina Bolshoi Theatre Orchestra 1980, VAI (DVD)

References

External links
Official webpage of Yuri Simonov
Rayfield Allied agency profile of Simonov

Living people
1941 births
Saint Petersburg Conservatory alumni
21st-century Russian conductors (music)
Russian male conductors (music)
21st-century Russian male musicians